Hanif Malik (born 19 February 1981) is a Pakistani cricketer. He played in 77 first-class and 39 List A matches between 2001 and 2010. He made his Twenty20 debut on 25 April 2005, for Hyderabad Hawks in the 2004–05 National Twenty20 Cup.

References

External links
 

1981 births
Living people
Pakistani cricketers
Hyderabad (Pakistan) cricketers
Pakistan Customs cricketers
Sui Northern Gas Pipelines Limited cricketers
Place of birth missing (living people)